"Open Up" is a song and hit single by the British group Mungo Jerry, first released in 1972.

Chart performance
Written by the group's lead vocalist Ray Dorset and produced by Barry Murray, it was the band's fifth single. The song made 21 in the UK Singles Chart in April 1972 staying in the charts for eight weeks.

Like the group's debut single, "In the Summertime," and following singles, it was a maxi-single playing at 33 rpm.  Other tracks on the extended play single were "Going Back Home", "I Don't Wanna Go Back to School" and "No Girl Reaction."

References

1972 singles
Mungo Jerry songs
Songs written by Ray Dorset
1972 songs
Dawn Records singles
Song recordings produced by Barry Murray